Los Angeles City Council District 5 is one of the 15 districts of the Los Angeles City Council. District 5 represents Los Angeles communities in the Westside, central-eastern Santa Monica Mountains, and central-southern San Fernando Valley. Katy Young Yaroslavsky is the current council member.

Geography

Present day district
The district covers all or a portion of the following communities and neighborhoods:

Westside
Bel Air, Beverly Crest, Beverly Grove, Beverlywood, California Country Club, Carthay Circle, Century City, Cheviot Hills, Comstock Hills, western Fairfax District, Holmby Hills, Melrose, Palms, Pico-Robertson, Roscomare, Westwood, UCLA, and Westside Village.

Valley
Encino and Oak Forest Canyon.

For all the neighborhoods within the 5th District, see the official City of Los Angeles map of District 5.

Historical locations
The 5th District was mapped at its origin in 1925 in the West Adams District of Los Angeles, but over the years its boundaries have been shifted west and north in keeping with the city's population changes. 

A new city charter effective in 1925 replaced the former "at large" voting system for a nine-member council with a district system with a 15-member council. Each district was to be approximately equal in population, based upon the voting in the previous gubernatorial election; thus redistricting was done every four years. (At present, redistricting is done every ten years, based upon the preceding U.S. census results.) The numbering system established in 1925 for City Council districts began with No. 1 in the north of the city, the San Fernando Valley, and ended with No. 15 in the south, the Harbor area.

The 5th District originally encompassed the West Adams area, bounded on the north by Washington Boulevard, on the south by  Exposition Boulevard, on the west by Robertson Boulevard and on the east approximately by Vermont Avenue.

The district has followed the increase in the population in Los Angeles from the west-of-Vermont area westward and northward toward the San Fernando Valley. Rough boundaries or descriptions of the 5th District have been as follows:

1926: West Adams and Jefferson Street area, with district headquarters at 2646 South Normandie Avenue.

1928: "The east boundary of the Fifth District remains as Vermont avenue and the south boundary remains as Exposition Boulevard. The north boundary runs from Vermont avenue west on Washington  street to Western avenue and then the line turns north on  Western avenue to Eighth street and west on Eighth street to West Boulevard, which constitutes the western boundary."

1932–33. "Bounded on the east by Vermont avenue, on the north by Wilshire Boulevard, on the west by La Brea avenue and on the south by Exposition Boulevard."

1937: ". . . on the east by Western to Pico, by Hobart to Washington, and by Vermont to Exposition and on the west by Crenshaw and Rimpau."

1940: On the north by Wilshire Boulevard, on the east by Western or Vermont, on the south by Exposition Boulevard, on the west by Arlington, Crenshaw and minor streets.

1949: ". . . part of the general Wilshire area."

1957: Part of the Wilshire Boulevard area, extending to Westwood and West Los Angeles.

1965. From Fairfax Avenue to the San Diego Freeway and from Bel-Air and Beverly Hills south to Washington Boulevard.

Population
According to the official website, the district has approximately 260,000 residents. The population is 74% White non-Hispanic, 10% Asian, 8% Latino, 4% mixed race, and 3% Black. The district is composed of approximately 46% homeowners and 54% renters.

Officeholders
District 5 has been represented by eleven council members.

Council member ephemera
 Robert Stewart Sparks's nickname was "Cupid," and he gave romantic advice.
 Roy Donley was acquitted on a charge of accepting a bribe.
 Byron B. Brainard died of strangulation on a piece of meat.
 Arthur E. Briggs was a law school dean.
 Rosalind Wiener Wyman, at age 22, was the youngest council member ever seated, and the second woman elected to the city council.
 Zev Yaroslavsky and Edmund D. Edelman were later elected Los Angeles County Supervisors.

See also
Los Angeles City Council districts
List of Los Angeles municipal election returns

References

Note: Access to most Los Angeles Times links requires the use of a library card.

External links
 Official Los Angeles City Council District 5 website
  City of Los Angeles: detailed street map showing boundaries and communities of District 5 
 Articles in the Los Angeles Times about District 5 since 1995

LACD05
LACD05
LACD05
Encino, Los Angeles
Bel Air, Los Angeles
LACD05
Holmby Hills, Los Angeles
Century City, Los Angeles
LACD05
Rancho Park, Los Angeles
LACD05
Westwood, Los Angeles
LACD05
LACD05